Pradeep Baliyan is an ex-MLA from Baghra constituency of Muzzaffar Nagar Dist. of Uttar Pradesh.

References

Uttar Pradesh politicians